The Special Permanent Committee on Institutions and Transparency is one of the four Special permanent committees of the Hellenic Parliament.

15th legislature (2012–14) 

In the 15th legislature, the committee initially consisted of the following 13 MPs:

 President
 Anastasios Nerantzis (Nea Dimokratia)

 Vice Presidents
 Theodoros Dritsas (Syriza)
 Ioannis Dimaras (ANEL)

 Initial members
 Nikos Tsoukalis (DIMAR)
 Zoi Konstantopoulou (Syriza)
 Panagiotis Lafazanis (Syriza)
 Manolis Kefalogiannis (Nea Dimokratia)
 Vyron Polydoras (Nea Dimokratia)
 Prokopis Pavlopoulos (Nea Dimokratia)
 Ioannis Tragakis (Nea Dimokratia)
 Michail Arvanitis-Avramis (Golden Dawn)
 Liana Kanelli (KKE)
 Apostolos Kaklamanis (PASOK)

In July 2013, the committee was enlarged, now encompassing 19 members. It was joined by the following MPs:

 Nikos Voutsis (Syriza)
 Theodora Tzakri (Syriza)
 Athanasios Bouras (Nea Dimokratia)
 John A. Kefalogiannis (Nea Dimokratia)
 Andreas Koutsoumbas (Nea Dimokratia)
 Dimitrios Tsoumanis (Nea Dimokratia)
 Panagiotis Rigas (PASOK)

External links
 Special Permanent Committee on Institutions and Transparency on the page of the Hellenic Parliament 

Hellenic Parliament
Parliamentary committees
Anti-corruption agencies
Corruption in Greece